is a Japanese musical children's television program which aired on NHK Educational. It is the 2nd NHK puppet variety show overall, the first one being Hotch Potch Station.

About the show
The program offers witty interpretations of classical music for children featuring puppets and a variety of music and cultural entertainment. This program introduces music into daily life for the pleasure of children, and features a musical group called The Evening Quintet. They play folk songs and classical music, with a variety of instruments such as piano, violin, and clarinet.

Program

Quintet
1st part: A formal theme songs is played.
2nd part: A puppet show is presented.
3rd part: Animation or other material.
4th part: A musical concert.
5th part: One of several ending themes, depending on the season.

Quintet Petit
Quintet Petit was broadcast from April 3, 2006 to March 30, 2007 and March 31, 2008 to March 27, 2009. It used the third and fourth parts from the main show.

Characters
Akira (Akira Miyagawa)
He is a puppet concert master and pianist. The audience does not know how old he is. He does not speak because he is not human. He also plays guitar, triangle, and other instruments. He wears glasses.
Score (Haruhiko Saitō)
He is a puppet cellist, 67 years old. He is funny and shy. He has beard. He had many careers when he was young.
Flat (Tesshō Genda)
He is a puppet clarinet player, 42 years old. He has a dog named Forte. He also plays the harmonica.
Aria (Ayumi Shigemori)
She is a 28-year-old puppet violinist, and the only female member. Her soprano voice is beautiful. She also plays accordion, but she cannot play the piano. She has blonde hair.
Sharp (Ken'ya Ōsumi)
He is a puppet trumpet player and percussion player. 22 years old, he likes soccer and comics. He also plays guitar. He's also good at painting pictures.
Chi-bō
He is a baby puppet and percussion player. He is 11 months old. He also sells concert tickets, and does camera work.

Partial list of original songs
The original songs are written by Kei Shimoyama and composed by Akira Miyagawa. Here are some of them.
 Midnight Zoo [真夜中の動物園]
 It's Good to Cry [泣いたっていいじゃない]
 Lie [うそ]
 I Hate Practicing [練習だいきらい]
 My habits [ぼくのクセ]
 "Someday When I Become a Star" [いつか星になったら]
 "I Got Hungry" [おなかがへった]
 "I Am Thinking Now" [ただいま考え中]
 "The Yawning Song" [あくびのうた]
 "The Secret Chocolate" [ひみつのチョコレート]
 "Baby" [赤ちゃん]
 "Tomorrow" [あした]
 "The Cello Player in Front of the Square" [広場のチェロ弾き]
 "Golden-ringed dragonfly" [赤とんぼ]
 "I ate too much" [たべすぎたのね]
 "The happiness Xmas" [しあわせクリスマス]
 "Oh, it smells good" [ああいいにおい]
 "Look at the sky" [空みてごらん]
 "Talking with Flowers" [おはなとおはなし]

Theme song
The 'You Gotta Quintet' Theme" is used to open and close the show. The lyrics of the theme song changes depending on the seasons; the spring version from March to May, summer from June to August, autumn from September to November, winter version from December to February. The lyrics of the opening theme was changed in 2007.

Singing corner
In this featurette the Quintet song team presents original songs, works derived from classical material, and folk songs. Here are some of them.
 "If You're Happy and You Know It"
 "Railway Songs Yamanote Line"
 "Zuizui Zukkoro Bashi"
 "Salut d'Amour"
 "Boléro"
 "Humoresque"
 "Wedding march"
 "Träumerei"
 "The Blue Danube"
 "La Prière d'une Vierge"

Repeat and Rebroadcast

Repeat
Puppet shows and animations from the fourth to the second part does not mean it is not a new one every time. Get a new one, but sometimes, most times are just trying to shuffle a play for broadcasting up to that point I did a full re-broadcast. This system is called repeat.
Only posts from the viewer does not repeat this.

Rebroadcast
Quintet
Two weeks in a row two weeks of reruns the previous week.
Quintet Petit
First week of each month, two weeks after this broadcast, a rerun of the first week of the third week, reruns will be broadcast two weeks to four weeks.

CDs and DVDs

CDs
You Gotta Quintet: Songs (2004)
You Gotta Quintet: Classics (2004)
You Gotta Quintet: Concert [コンサート] (2005)
You Gotta Quintet: à la Carte [アラカルテ] (2005)
You Gotta Quintet: Are Kore [アレ！コレ！] (2006)
I'm Thinking About It [ただいま考え中] (2007)
You Gotta Quintet: Midnight Zoo [真夜中の動物園] (2008)
You Gotta Quintet: Dream Continuation [夢のつづき] (2010)
You Gotta Quintet Best Selection 66 Songs (2010)
You Gotta Quintet: What! Sense? [エッ！センス？] (2011)

DVDs
Classic [クラシック] (2006)
Original [オリジナル] (2006)
Harvest Festival [収穫祭] (2007)
It Is This What! [なに！これ！] (2007)
A Concert Almost Empty [ガラガラコンサート] (2008)
Ten Komori [テンコモリ] (2009)
The Only Anime [トコトンアニメ] (2009)
The Whole Years [ネンガラネンジュウ] (2010)
GOOOOOAL!（ゴール！） (2011)

Awards
On December 1, 2005, the program won an Asia-Pacific Broadcasting Union Award in the children/young people program section with the notation "that was able to stream down splendor, the pleasure that this program used the doll, and the music had" at the 42nd annual general meeting in Hanoi, Vietnam.

Production
Producer/Director: Kei Shimoyama
Music: Akira Miyagawa, Zenyō Nagayama, Vega Ensemble, Face Music
Drawing supervision: Ryuji Fujieda and his design studio
Character design: Ryuji Fujieda and his design studio
Animation: Tadahiko Horiguchi
Puppets produced by: Matsushima Hiroshi
Puppetmaster: Kigutsunoki
Supervision: Yasuhiro Kondō
Production Company - 81 Produce
Studio - NHK

References

External links
Quintet (Quintet at the NHK web page)

Japanese children's television series
Japanese television shows featuring puppetry
NHK original programming
2003 Japanese television series debuts
2013 Japanese television series endings